Marie Bountrogianni (born December 10, 1956) is the former Dean of The G. Raymond Chang School of Continuing Education at Ryerson University. She is also the former Chief psychologist of the Hamilton Board of Education, the former President and Executive Director of ROM (Royal Ontario Museum) Governors, and former member of Provincial Parliament. She was a member of the Legislative Assembly of Ontario, and a cabinet minister in the government of Liberal Premier Dalton McGuinty.

Background
Bountrogianni was born in Hamilton, Ontario, the daughter of Greek immigrants.  She received a Bachelor of Arts degree from the University of Waterloo in 1979, a Master of Education degree from the University of Toronto in 1980, and a Doctor of Education degree from the latter institution in 1983.

She became a registered psychologist in 1985, and was employed in psychological work at the Toronto Board of Education from 1984 to 1988. From 1989 to 1999, she was Chief Psychologist of the Hamilton Board of Education. Bountrogianni also served as an assistant professor at Wilfrid Laurier University from 1985 to 1987, and McMaster University from 1992 to 1999, and was the Vice-Chair of St. Peter's Hospital in Hamilton from 1995 to 1999. In 1997, she was hired by the European Union to evaluate proposals for graduate school funding. Locally, she has also served as an honorary co-Chair of Hamilton & Bay AIDSwalk and Grace Haven Capital Campaign. She was a director at Northland Power Inc. and Chair of its Governance Committee until May 2022. Marie also sits on the board of the Democracy Study Center in Kyiv, Ukraine and on the Advisory Council of Eurobank’s incubator, the egg, in Athens, Greece.

Politics

Provincial
Bountrogianni ran for the Ontario legislature in the 1995 provincial election, as a Liberal candidate in the riding of Hamilton Mountain. She finished ahead of incumbent New Democrat Brian Charlton, but 1028 votes behind the winner, Progressive Conservative Trevor Pettit.

Bountrogianni ran against Pettit again in the 1999 provincial election. There was some uncertainty in the riding as to whether Bountrogianni or NDP candidate Chris Charlton (wife of Brian) would have a better chance of defeating Pettit. Charlton received some union support but the teachers and the building trades backed Bountrogianni.  As it happened, Bountrogianni was able to defeat Pettit by over 2500 votes, with Charlton finishing third.  The Progressive Conservatives won the election, and Bountrogianni became the opposition critic for Colleges and Universities as well as Women's Issues.  In 2002, she was named Woman of the Year in Politics by the Hamilton Status of Women Committee.

Bountrogianni was re-elected in the 2003 election, in which the Liberals won a majority.  On October 23, 2003, she was named Minister of Children's Services and Minister of Citizenship and Immigration.

In October 2004, Bountrogianni introduced and stewarded the passage of the AODA, the Accessibility for Ontarians with Disabilities Act After a cabinet shuffle on June 29, 2005, Bountrogianni was named Minister of Intergovernmental Affairs and Minister responsible for Democratic Renewal.

She decided not to run for re-election in 2007, and was succeeded by another Liberal, Sophia Aggelonitis.

Cabinet positions

Provincial electoral record

Federal attempt
In 2011, she ran as the Liberal candidate in the 2011 federal election, finishing third behind Terry Anderson and the winner, New Democrat incumbent Chris Charlton.

Federal electoral record

After politics
In 2007, she became President of the Royal Ontario Museum but stepped down in February 2011 (to run for federal parliament). From 2007 to 2012, she served on the Child and Youth Committee for the Mental Health Commission of Canada (MHCC). In 2012, she was a professor at Ryerson’s G. Raymond Chang School of Continuing Education, where she performed research and taught political psychology courses. On July 1, 2013, she was appointed the interim Dean of the Chang School of Continuing Education. On April 23, 2014, she was named Dean of the Chang School of Continuing Education. She served as Dean until May 2019. She was appointed as Chair of the Board of Help Us Help in 2020, a foundation supporting orphans and vets in Ukraine.

See also
 List of University of Waterloo people

References

External links
 Consul General Chen Xiaoling Visited Hon. Marie Bountrogianni, Minister of Citizenship and Immigration of the Province of Ontario 
 Marie Bountrogianni: Laurier Library Images
 

1956 births
Canadian people of Greek descent
Women government ministers of Canada
Candidates in the 2011 Canadian federal election
Living people
Academic staff of McMaster University
Members of the Executive Council of Ontario
Ontario Liberal Party MPPs
Politicians from Hamilton, Ontario
University of Waterloo alumni
University of Toronto alumni
Academic staff of Wilfrid Laurier University
Women MPPs in Ontario
21st-century Canadian women politicians
Liberal Party of Canada candidates for the Canadian House of Commons